Logi Gunnarsson (born 5 September 1981) is an Icelandic basketball player for Njarðvík of the Icelandic Úrvalsdeild karla and a former member of the Icelandic national basketball team, where he participated at the EuroBasket 2015 and EuroBasket 2017. During his career he has won the Icelandic championship three times, in 1998, 2001 and 2002, and the Icelandic Cup twice, in 2002 and 2021. In 2001, he was named the Icelandic Male Basketball Player of the Year.

Playing career
Logi came up through the junior programs of Njarðvík and played his first games with the senior team during the 1997–1998 season. He scored a season high 20 points against KFÍ on 8 March 1998. He played limited minutes in Njarðvík's playoffs run which ended with a three game sweep of KR in the finals.

The following season Logi moved to the United States where he played high school basketball for St. Mary High School in Rutherford, New Jersey. He returned to Iceland and joined Njarðvík again in February 2000. He went on to average 9.5 points and scored a season high 25 points against Körfuknattleiksfélag ÍA on 3 March 2000. During the playoffs, he averaged 11.3 points but was unable to stop Njarðvík from losing against eventual champions KR in the semi-finals.

On 5 January 2020, he appeared in an Úrvalsdeild game for the fourth different decade. During the 2020-2021 season, the 25th of his career, Logi averaged 11.5 points per game.

On 18 September 2021 he scored 14 points in Njarðvík's 97–93 win against Stjarnan in the Icelandic Cup final, ending the clubs 16 year major title draught. On 2 October 2021, he had scored 2 points in Njarðvík's 100–113 loss against Þór Þorlákshöfn in the Icelandic Super Cup. In October, he suffered a knee injury after a collision with a teammate during a game between Njarðvík and Valur and was expected to miss six weeks.

In August 2022, he signed a 2-year contract extension with Njarðvík. On 29 December 2022, he became the oldest player to score 20 points in an Úrvalsdeild karla game when he had 23 points in a victory against Keflavík, breaking Alexander Ermolinskij's record from 2001.

National team career
On 25 July 2011 Logi scored his one-thousandth point for the national team. He participated with Iceland at the EuroBasket 2015 and EuroBasket 2017. He has also participated five–times at the Games of the Small States of Europe.

On 19 February 2018 Logi announced that he would retire from national team play after Iceland's games against Finland and the Czech Republic in the 2019 FIBA Basketball World Cup qualification later that month. From 2000 to 2018 he played 147 games for the national team.

Personal life
Logi is the son of former Icelandic national team player Gunnar Þorvarðarson.

References

External links
Korisliiga profile at korisliiga.fi
Icelandic statistics 2008-present at kki.is
Icelandic statistics 1997-2002 at kki.is

1981 births
Living people
Giessen 46ers players
Gijón Baloncesto players
Logi Gunnarsson
Logi Gunnarsson
Logi Gunnarsson
Logi Gunnarsson
Logi Gunnarsson
Logi Gunnarsson
Medi Bayreuth players
Logi Gunnarsson
Logi Gunnarsson
Ratiopharm Ulm players
Shooting guards
Solna Vikings players
Torpan Pojat players
Logi Gunnarsson